This is a list of LGBTI (lesbian, gay, bisexual, transgender and intersex) holders of political offices in Australia. Currently and historically there are no intersex parliamentarians, although Tony Briffa is known as the world's first openly intersex mayor and "first known intersex public office-bearer in the Western world", having served as Deputy Mayor of the City of Hobsons Bay between 2009–2011 and Mayor between 2011–2012.

Federal parliament

Tasmania 
Former:
Bob Brown (Independent Green) – 1983–1993
Alison Standen (Labor) – 2018–2021
Historic firsts:
Party leader: Bob Brown (Greens) – 1989–1993

New South Wales

Legislative Council
Current:
Penny Sharpe (Labor) – 2005
Shayne Mallard (Liberals) – 2015
Mark Pearson (Animal Justice Party) – 2015
Chris Rath (Liberals) – 2022
Former:
Michael Yabsley (Liberals) – 1984–1994  [Came out: 2020]
Paul O'Grady (Labor) – 1988–1996 [Came out: 1990]
Michael Egan (Labor) – 1986–2005 [Came out: 1995]
Helen Westwood (Labor) – 2007–2015
Don Harwin (Liberals)  – 2011–2022 [Came out: 2014]

Legislative Assembly
Current:
Alex Greenwich (Independent) – 2012
Former:
Michael Egan (Labor) – 1978–1984
Tony Doyle (Labor) – 1985–1994 [Came out: 1994]
Bruce Notley-Smith (Liberal) – 2011–2019

Western Australia

Legislative Council
Current:
Stephen Dawson (Labor) – 2013
Peter Foster (Labor) – 2021
Former:
Giz Watson (Greens) – 1997–2013
Lynn MacLaren (Greens) – 2005, 2009–2017
Louise Pratt (Labor) – 2001–2007

Legislative Assembly

Current
Stuart Aubrey (Labor) – 2021
Lisa Baker (Labor) – 2008
John Carey (Labor) – 2017
Former:
John Hyde (Labor) – 2001–2013

Victoria

Legislative Council

Current:
 Harriet Shing (Labor) – 2014
 Aiv Puglielli (Greens) – 2022

Former:
 Andrew Olexander (Liberal) – 1999–2006

Legislative Assembly

Current:
Steve Dimopoulos (Labor) – 2014
  Gabrielle De Vietri (Greens) – 2022

South Australia

Legislative Council 

Current:
Ian Hunter (Labor) – 2006
 Former:
 Don Dunstan (Labor) – 1953–1979
 Kelly Vincent (Dignity) – 2010–2018
Historic Firsts:
 Premier: Don Dunstan (Labor) – 1967

Australian Capital Territory 
Current:
Andrew Barr (Labor) – 2006
 Chris Steel (Labor) – 2016
Suzanne Orr (Labor) – 2016
Jonathan Davis (Greens) – 2020
Historic firsts:
 Government minister: Andrew Barr (Labor) – 2006
 Chief Minister: Andrew Barr (Labor) – 2014

Northern Territory
Current:
 Chansey Paech (Labor) – 2016

Officeholders:
 Leader of the Opposition: Jodeen Carney (Liberal) – (2005)
 Speaker of the Assembly: Chansey Paech (Labor) – (2020)

See also

 List of the first LGBT holders of political offices

References

 
Lists of Australian people
Australia
Lists of Australian politicians
Lists of the first LGBT holders of political offices